Shukhov Tower is a broadcasting tower in Moscow, Russia.

Shukhov Tower may also refer to:

Russia
 Shukhov Tower on the Oka River, an electric power transmission tower in Nizhny Novgorod
 Shukhov Tower in Polibino, the world's first diagrid hyperboloid structure